Sex Pot is a 2009 direct to DVD sex comedy film produced by The Asylum and written and directed by Eric Forsberg. Released in both 3D and standard formats, the film follows two high school seniors who find a stash of marijuana that wildly increases sex drive.

Plot

Spanky and Mert are best friends who are left alone for the weekend.  At Mert's apartment, they find a pot stash that Mert's brother left behind and upon smoking it, realize that it increases tremendously their sexual drive. Mert- a self-assured jerk- and Lothario, decide to attend a pool party in Malibu: They follow a pair of wild loose women, named Cindy and June, who live in the apartment next to theirs, to hook up with them. The two stoners run into a series of misadventures to get to the party and are being chased by the angry Pinky who is looking for Mert's brother, her husband.

Spanky and Mert first go to a liquor store to buy some hard liquor to take with them to the party. Since both are underage, they try to find someone who will buy the liquor for them. Spanky meets two prostitutes, named Princess and Strawberry, who agree to buy them the hard liquor so the guys can take them to the party. On their way there, they all smoke a little of the magical pot which makes Mert drive erratically and suddenly they are pulled over by a cop. Mert is forced to throw the pot stash out the window to avoid being arrested for possession of narcotics. The female police officer who pulls them over is also a loose woman who gets high from the marijuana: She lets them off with only a warning.

The stash gets stolen by a young girl who picks the lost pot up off the street. Spanky and Mert chase the young girl to a house where a birthday party for a young boy is being held. Pretending to be friends of the birthday boy's, Spanky and Mert enter and venture to the basement where a "pot party" is being held by the older brother of the birthday boy. Mert manages to retrieve the pot from the 11-year-old drug dealer, while Spanky takes drags on various joints to find the right one, and when he goes into a bedroom to have an encounter with a party girl, he finds the girl to be his 14-year-old underage sister Ellen, who has a secret life as 'Sara the Skank' while hooking up with numerous guys at parties.

Spanky and Mert flee the house and meet again with Princess and Strawberry on the street by their van where they have another run-in with Pinky, who Mert manages to calm down and invite to the party by having her smoke a little of the grass.

The guys with their girls finally arrive at the pool party where Mert attempts to make a few of the women there smoke the magical pot, only to lose the stash. One of the women smokes it and gives it to some of her friends which turns the party into a full-on lesbian orgy. Yet, Mert and Spanky are left out when Spanky hooks up with Princess and Mert hooks up with Pinky. Strawberry hooks up with the home's owner.

The next morning when the party is over, the guys and all the party guests leave. Spanky says goodbye to Princess who returns to her original life, no longer a streetwalker. Mert, who still prides himself on being a world class jerk, dumps Pinky so he can focus on looking for his next one-night stand, and now Pinky focuses her attention on getting back at Mert. Spanky goes to meet with his parents where they pick him up to take him home. He tells them that his weekend was "uneventful".

Cast
 Rollin Perry as Josh "Spanky" Green
 Seth Cassell as Mert
 Michelle Penick as "Princess"
 Rana Davis as "Strawberry"
 Lindsey Ahern as "Pinky"
 Maurice Constable as Mr. Clink
 Teryl Brouillette as Ellen Green
 Lola Forsberg as Leah
 Deirdre Lyons as Officer Bendover
 Christine Nguyen as Cindy
 Jasna Novosel as June
 Jackie Nico as Linda
 Sarah Agor as Julie
 Sarah Bennett as Amanda
 Brent Anthony as Joe "Little Jo-Jo"
 Deanne Destler as Maureen
 Denise Gossett as Mrs. Green
 Chad Nell as Mr. Green

References

External links

2009 films
2000s sex comedy films
2009 independent films
The Asylum films
2000s English-language films
American sex comedy films
American films about cannabis
Films directed by Eric Forsberg
Stoner films
2009 comedy films
2000s American films
Films with screenplays by Eric Forsberg